This is the list of episodes for Late Night with Seth Meyers in 2019.

2019

January

February

March

April

May

June

July

August

September

October

November
December

References

External links
 
 Lineups at Interbridge 

Episodes
Lists of American non-fiction television series episodes
2019 American television seasons
Lists of variety television series episodes